Petrovka is a rural locality (a village) in Orlovsky Selsoviet, Yanaulsky District, Bashkortostan, Russia. The population was 171 as of 2010. There is 1 street.

Geography 
Petrovka is located 24 km southeast of Yanaul (the district's administrative centre) by road. Atlegach is the nearest rural locality.

References 

Rural localities in Yanaulsky District